Carlos de la Torre y Huerta (May 15, 1858 in Matanzas, Cuba – February 19, 1950 in Havana) was a Cuban naturalist.

He was the president of House of Representatives from November 1903 to April 1904.

He is commemorated in the scientific name of a species of Cuban gecko, Sphaerodactylus torrei.

References

Speakers of the House of Representatives of Cuba
1858 births
1950 deaths
People from Matanzas